Kritsananon Srisuwan (born January 11, 1995), is a Thai professional footballer who plays as a midfielder for Thai League 1 club Ratchaburi Mitr Phol.

References

External links

1995 births
Living people
Kritsananon Srisuwan
Kritsananon Srisuwan
Association football midfielders
Kritsananon Srisuwan
Kritsananon Srisuwan